Amanda Coetzer and Inés Gorrochategui were the defending champions but only Coetzer competed that year with Lori McNeil.

Coetzer and McNeil lost in the semifinals to Meredith McGrath and Larisa Neiland.

McGrath and Neiland won in the final 6–1, 5–7, 7–6 against Martina Hingis and Helena Suková.

Seeds
Champion seeds are indicated in bold text while text in italics indicates the round in which those seeds were eliminated. The top four seeded teams received byes into the second round.

Draw

Finals

Top half

Bottom half

External links
 1996 WTA German Open Doubles Draw

WTA German Open
1996 WTA Tour